"Broken Heroes" is a song by English soft rock musician Chris Norman, released as a single in 1988. It appears as the first track on the 1988 compilation album, Hits from the Heart. The song, produced and written by Dieter Bohlen, one half of Modern Talking, was a top 10 hit in Germany and Austria, peaking at numbers 3 and 7, respectively.

"Broken Heroes" was the soundtrack to the German film, Tatort: .

Track listing
German 12" single
A. "Broken Heroes" - 7:31
B1. "Broken Heroes" (Instrumental) (by Modern Symphonic Orchestra) - 3:27
B2. "Broken Heroes" (Radio Version) - 3:20

References

1988 songs
1988 singles
Chris Norman songs
Hansa Records singles
Songs written by Dieter Bohlen
Song recordings produced by Dieter Bohlen